Edward Bates Pond (September 7, 1833 – April 22, 1910) was an American politician active in California. He was the 21st Mayor of San Francisco serving from 1887 to 1891.

In 1890, he ran for Governor of California. At the California Democratic State Convention, San Francisco Boss Christopher Buckley backed Mayor Pond. Edward B. Pond defeated William D. English of Oakland for the nomination. In the general election, Edward Pond lost to Republican, Henry Markham. 

His grandson was Samuel 'Pete' Pond (1914–2004), a former Dean at Stanford University.

References

External links 

 The SF Public Library has a picture of him and his house.

Mayors of San Francisco
1833 births
1910 deaths
California Democrats
19th-century American politicians